Kinzekeyevo (Kinyäkäy) is a rural locality (a selo) in Skvorchikhinsky Selsoviet, Ishimbaysky District, Bashkortostan, Russia. The population was 261 as of 2010. There are 4 streets.

Geography 
Kinzekeyevo is located 27 km south of Ishimbay (the district's administrative centre) by road. Skvorchikha is the nearest rural locality.

References 

Rural localities in Ishimbaysky District
Ufa Governorate